Snœr may refer to:

Norse mythology
 Snær, seemingly a personification of snow
 Snör, bride of Karl in the Eddic poem Rígsþula